T in the Park 2003 was a music festival that took place on 12–13 July 2003 in Kinross, Scotland. It was the 10th anniversary of the festival. 55,000 people attended the concert, an increase of 5,000 from the previous year. Headlining acts were R.E.M., The Flaming Lips and Coldplay. The White Stripes had been scheduled to perform as well, but they backed out at the last minute.

Jack McConnell attended for the first time and said, "It's great to see so many young people enjoying themselves and the festival is very valuable to both the locals and the national economy. It also offers a great opportunity to showcase the Scottish music industry and symbolizes the modern Scotland that we want to portray."

Tayside Police said there were 24 arrests for minor offences and praised the crowd for their good behaviour over the three days.

Tickets
Tickets for the 2003 festival were sold out eight days before the event started. An extra 5,000 tickets were also made available as the demand was the highest since 1993.

Line up
The 2003 line-up was:

Main Stage

BBC Radio 1/NME Stage

King Tut's Wah Wah Tent

X Tent

Slam Tent

T Break Stage

References

T in the Park
2003 in Scotland
2003 in British music
July 2003 events in the United Kingdom
2003 music festivals